From. WJSN (Hangul: From. 우주소녀) is the third extended play by South Korean-Chinese girl group WJSN. It was released on January 4, 2017, by Starship Entertainment and distributed by LOEN Entertainment. To promote the EP, the group appeared on several South Korean music programs, including Music Bank and Inkigayo. The song "I Wish" was released as the lead song from the EP with a Chinese version included.

The EP was a commercial success, reaching number 4 on the Gaon Album Chart.

Release 
From. WJSN was released on January 4, 2017, at midnight KST though several music portals, including Melon in South Korea.

Promotion 
In order to promote the EP, the group performed "I Wish" on several music programs. They started their comeback stage on Mnet's M Countown on January 5, followed by KBS's Music Bank on January 6, MBC's Show! Music Core on January 7 and SBS's Inkigayo on January 8.

Commercial performance 
From. WJSN entered at number 6 on the Gaon Album Chart on the chart issue dated January 1–7, 2017. In its second week, the mini-album fell to number 14. But in its fifth week, it rose to number four, their highest placement since their debut.

The title track, "I Wish", entered at number 49 on the Gaon Digital Chart on the chart issue dated January 1–7, 2017, with 41,923 downloads sold in its first four days.

Track listing

Charts

References 

2017 EPs
Starship Entertainment EPs
Cosmic Girls EPs